Cloyd V. "Big Red" Money (February 21, 1901 – March 19, 1977) was an American football, basketball, and baseball coach and college athletic administrator. He served as the head football coach at Hanover College (1927–1931), the University of Louisville (1932), Shurtleff College (1936–1939), Ferris Institute—now known as Ferris State University (1940–1941), and Northern Michigan University (1947–1955). Money was also the head basketball coach at Hanover (1927–1932), Louisville (1932–1936), Ferris (1940–1942), and Northern Michigan (1947–1956), amassing a career college basketball record of 180–164. In addition, he coached baseball at Louisville from 1933 to 1936, tallying a mark of 18–15.

Early life and education
A native of Jay County, Indiana, Money was graduated from high school in Union City, Indiana. He lettered in football, basketball, and baseball at Ohio Northern University and earned a master's degree from Indiana University.

Coaching career
Money was the head football coach at the University of Louisville in 1932 and the school's basketball coach from 1932 to 1936. He was largely unsuccessful in football, failing to win any of the nine games he coached. He was a more successful basketball coach, amassing a 42–40 record in four seasons. From 1940 to 1941, he moved to Ferris Institute to coach football, compiling a 2–11–1 record there.

Death
Money died on March 19, 1977, in Marquette, Michigan.

Head coaching record

Football

References

External links
 

1901 births
1977 deaths
Ferris State Bulldogs football coaches
Ferris State Bulldogs men's basketball coaches
Hanover Panthers football coaches
Hanover Panthers men's basketball coaches
Louisville Cardinals athletic directors
Louisville Cardinals baseball coaches
Louisville Cardinals football coaches
Louisville Cardinals men's basketball coaches
Northern Michigan Wildcats athletic directors
Northern Michigan Wildcats football coaches
Northern Michigan Wildcats men's basketball coaches
Ohio Northern Polar Bears baseball players
Ohio Northern Polar Bears football players
Ohio Northern Polar Bears men's basketball players
Shurtleff Pioneers football coaches
Valley City State Vikings athletic directors
Indiana University alumni
Ohio Northern University alumni
People from Jay County, Indiana
People from Union City, Indiana
Coaches of American football from Indiana
Players of American football from Indiana
Baseball players from Indiana
Basketball coaches from Indiana
Basketball players from Indiana